Nutrient budgets offer insight into the balance between crop inputs and outputs. In short, they compare nutrients applied to the soil to nutrients taken up by crops. A nutrient budget takes into account all the nutrient inputs on a farm and all those removed from the land. The most obvious source of nutrients in this situation is fertilizer, but this is only part of the picture. Other inputs come with rainfall, in supplements brought on to the farm and in effluent – either farm or dairy factory – spread on the land. In addition, nutrients can be moved around the farm – from an area used for growing silage to the area used to feed it out, from paddock to raceway, and within paddocks in dung and urine patches. Nutrients are removed from the farm in stock sold on, products (meat, milk, wool), crops sold or fed out off farm, and through processes such as nitrate leaching, volatilization and phosphate run-off etc.

Importance

An accurate nutrient budget is an important tool to provide an early indication of potential problems arising from (i) a nutrient surplus (inputs>outputs), leading to an accumulation of nutrients and increased risk of loss or (ii) a deficit (outputs>inputs), depleting nutrient reserves and increasing the risk of deficiencies and reduced crop yields. They also provide regulatory authorities with a readily-determined, comparative indicator of environmental impact. Overall, nutrient budgets help ensure that farming practices are conducted in an efficient, economic, and environmentally sustainable manner.

Assumptions

A nutrient budget isn't as exact as a financial statement. An assortment of variables affects each tract of land. For example, some areas may have had too much manure applied over time or it may have been unevenly distributed, and previous flooding could affect results. Limits and assumptions should be incorporated when compiling a budget including the average nutrient removal coefficient values if they are not specific to a certain field.

Soil test This component is complementary to the budget and lets you know what nutrients are already available to crops and helps you plan input purchases. It is a critical best management practice (BMP) in the 4R strategy.
Yield history By examining the historical yields of crops take from specific fields, you can calculate nutrient removal over time. Yield history may also help better predict the amount of uptake that will occur with similar crops planted in the future.
Previous applications Knowing what's been applied to the field in years past will offer insight into what may already be in the ground or what nutrients may no longer be present.
Water Consider what kind of water has been applied to the field. Does irrigation water contain dissolved nutrients such as nitrogen (N), sulfur (S), or chloride (Cl)? If so, it should be counted as input.
What's around you? Consider water sources that could run into your field. Is there a manufacturing facility nearby? What makes up these water sources can impact how you plant.

See also
Fertilizer
Nutrient management
Sustainable agriculture

References

Agriculture
Agricultural soil science
Sustainable agriculture